Gilbert Motier Woodward (December 25, 1835March 13, 1914) was an American lawyer and politician.  He served one term in the United States House of Representatives, representing Wisconsin's 7th congressional district.  He was also the 16th mayor of La Crosse, Wisconsin, and the Democratic nominee for Governor of Wisconsin in 1886.  During the American Civil War he served as a Union Army officer in the famed Iron Brigade of the Army of the Potomac.

Early life
Woodward was born December 25, 1835, in Washington, D.C., and was educated in the common schools.  He learned the printing trade working as an apprentice in Baltimore, and worked as a printer and proofreader in Baltimore, Upper Marlboro, and Washington, until 1860.  In Washington, he spent most of his time working for the historic National Intelligencer newspaper.

In February 1860 he moved west to Wisconsin and settled at La Crosse.  He studied law in the office of Isaac E. Messmore and was admitted to the bar in 1861.  Due to the outbreak of the American Civil War, Woodward postponed his plans to start a legal practice and instead enlisted for service in the Union Army.

Civil War service
Woodward joined a company of volunteers known as the "La Crosse Light Guards", which was organized into Company B of the 2nd Wisconsin Infantry Regiment at Camp Randall.  The 2nd Wisconsin Infantry mustered into federal service in June 1861 and proceeded to Washington, D.C., for service in the eastern theater of the war.

He was promoted to first sergeant in September 1861, after the First Battle of Bull Run.  That Fall, the regiment was organized into a brigade with the 6th Wisconsin, 7th Wisconsin, and 19th Indiana infantry regiments.  The brigade would shortly become famous as the Iron Brigade of the Army of the Potomac due to their performance in the Battle of Gainesville in August 1862.  Just days before that battle, Woodward was commissioned as second lieutenant of his company.

In the next month, their captain was killed at the Battle of South Mountain and Woodward was promoted to first lieutenant.  With his regiment, he went on to participate in the Battle of Antietam in September, then the Battle of Fredericksburg in December 1862 and the Battle of Chancellorsville in the Spring of 1863.  Following Chancellorsville, Woodward was appointed adjutant of the regiment, serving Colonel Lucius Fairchild, but was then quickly detailed as an adjutant to the brigade commander, General Solomon Meredith.  He was serving on Meredith's staff during the Battle of Gettysburg and was shot in the forearm.  After a brief recuperation, he resumed his service as an aide to General Lysander Cutler in the Overland Campaign of 1864 until the expiration of his enlistment on July 2, 1864.

Legal and political career
After the war Woodward became active in the legal community in La Crosse and was elected district attorney of La Crosse County in 1865.  He was subsequently re-elected three times, serving until January 1874.  While serving as district attorney, he formed a law partnership with Samuel S. Burton in 1868, which continued until 1876.

He also became active in state politics.  He ran for Wisconsin State Senate in 1872 as a Liberal Republican on the Reform coalition ticket, but was defeated by Republican Gideon Hixon.  In the Spring election of 1874, he was narrowly elected mayor of La Crosse, defeating a Republican-Temperance unity ticket led by Sylvester Nevins.  He was subsequently elected city attorney and served from 1876 through 1882.

Woodward ran for United States House of Representatives in 1882 and received the Democratic nomination on the first ballot of their convention.  The 7th congressional district was a safe Republican seat through the 1870s, but the redistricting of 1882 moved three-term incumbent Herman L. Humphrey into a different congressional district.  Woodward won the general election in an upset with 48% of the vote, as the Prohibition Party candidate took 7%.  He served in the Forty-eighth Congress (March 4, 1883March 3, 1885), but lost his run for re-election in 1884.

After leaving office he resumed his law practice in La Crosse, but remained active in the Democratic Party.  At the 1886 Democratic State Convention, former congressman and Union Army colonel Gabriel Bouck was largely expected to accept the party's nomination for Governor of Wisconsin, but unexpectedly sent a letter declining the nomination at the start of the convention.  Charles Jonas of Racine was considered a strong candidate for the nomination, but was damaged by an aggressive pressure campaign driven by Labor and Socialist activists from Milwaukee.  Woodward's name was ultimately proposed to the convention by congressman and power-broker Edward S. Bragg, who had served with Woodward in the Iron Brigade.  Woodward was warmly received by the convention and nominated by acclamation.

Woodward was defeated in the general election as Republican Jeremiah McLain Rusk won his third term as governor.  Woodward's last significant political activity was serving as chairman of the Wisconsin delegation to the 1888 Democratic National Convention.

The next year he formed a law partnership with J. W. Losey, known as Losey & Woodward, and devoted most of the remainder of his life to his legal career.  He was known as a frequent litigant in front of the Wisconsin Supreme Court.

Personal life and family
Woodward married Ella R. Parker in 1864, but she died just a few years later, in 1868.  They had no children and Woodward never remarried.

Woodward died at the home of D. A. MacDonald on March 13, 1914.  Though his health had been declining for years, he worked until three months before his death.  He was buried at Oak Grove Cemetery in La Crosse.

Electoral history

Wisconsin Senate (1872)

| colspan="6" style="text-align:center;background-color: #e9e9e9;"| General Election, November 5, 1872

U.S. House of Representatives (1882, 1884)

| colspan="6" style="text-align:center;background-color: #e9e9e9;"| General Election, November 7, 1882

| colspan="6" style="text-align:center;background-color: #e9e9e9;"| General Election, November 4, 1884

Wisconsin Governor (1886)

| colspan="6" style="text-align:center;background-color: #e9e9e9;"| General Election, November 2, 1886

References

External links

1835 births
1914 deaths
Mayors of places in Wisconsin
People from Washington, D.C.
Politicians from La Crosse, Wisconsin
Iron Brigade
Union Army officers
People of Wisconsin in the American Civil War
Wisconsin lawyers
Democratic Party members of the United States House of Representatives from Wisconsin
19th-century American politicians
19th-century American lawyers